The Aktiengesellschaft für Automobilbau (= corporation for automotive engineering, abbreviation  A.G.A. or AGA) was a German producer of cars in the 1920s in the German capital of Berlin.

The company was founded as Autogen-Gas-Akkumulator-AG in Berlin in 1909 as the German subsidiary of the Swedish company Aktiebolaget Gasaccumulator, since 2000 a part of the German Linde group.  During World War I the company produced parts for machine-guns, and had a new factory constructed on Herzbergstraße in the suburb of Lichtenberg. The company was rebranded as Aktiengesellschaft für Automobilbau in 1920, but AGA was refounded at the same time, so that both gas and automotive versions of the company existed simultaneously.  In 1922 AGA became part of Stinnes-trust.  AGA continued to be active after 1945 in West Berlin.  Those data are based on the commercial register in the  Berlin Landesarchiv.

The first car, the Typ A of 1919, had a 1418 cc four-cylinder engine driving the rear wheels through a three-speed manual transmission. Only very few cars of that kind were built. Never realized was a Typ D.  This type had in the very beginning . The car was without much obvious technical ambition, but it was robust and inexpensive for its size, becoming popular especially with small business owners despite its dire brakes. In several cities, including Berlin and Breslau, it was for some time a popular car for use as a taxi.

After the death of Hugo Stinnes in 1924, AGA ran into cashflow difficulties, which ended in the company's bankruptcy at the end of 1925.  Stinnes' son Edmund had been trying to implement a very expensive assembly line production at AGA, but never finished the project.

There were also plans for a small 850cc car to be built under licence from Singer Motors, and a  six-cylinder model, but these never reached the production stage.  However, production from 1926 was severely curtailed, and ended in 1929.  By that time between 8,000 and 12,000 AGA cars were produced.

AGA cars featured in a number of races, with notable Willy Loge as one of the drivers.  For the 1924 Targa Florio AGA produced a small number of the TF 6/30 PS sports cars featuring a 1490cc engine. AGA won many races and was entered in the 1926 German Grand Prix.  Other racers also drove AGA cars.

The Swedish company Thulin made around a hundred AGA cars under licence between 1920 and 1924.

References
 Kai-Uwe Merz: Der AGA-Wagen. Eine Automobil-Geschichte aus Berlin, Verlag Berlin Story (2011, September), 
 Kai-Uwe Merz: Das Automobil des Nobelpreisträgers. Archivalische Studien zur Berliner Autogen-Gasaccumulator Aktiengesellschaft (AGA), der Berliner Aktiengesellschaft für Automobilbau (AGA) und der Stockholmer Aktiebolaget Gas-Accumulator (AGA), in: Berlin in Geschichte und Gegenwart, Jahrbuch des Landesarchivs Berlin 2011, edited by Werner Breunig and Uwe Schaper, Gebr. Mann Verlag Berlin (2011), 
 David Hawtin: An East German Refugee. Vintage Aga 6/20 PS, in: The Automobile, Vol. 8, No. 1, (March 1990)

External links

 http://www.agamobil.de (in German)

Vintage vehicles
Defunct motor vehicle manufacturers of Germany
Manufacturing companies based in Berlin
Companies of Prussia